し, in hiragana, or シ in katakana, is one of the Japanese kana, which each represent one mora. The shapes of these kana have origins in the character 之. The katakana form has become increasingly popular as an emoticon in the Western world due to its resemblance to a smiling face.

The dakuten form of this character is used when transliterating "di" occasionally, as opposed to チ's dakuten form, or a de assigned to a small i; for example, Aladdin is written as アラジン Arajin, and radio is written as ラジオ.

In the Ainu language, シ is used to represent the  sound.  It can also be written as a small ㇱ to represent a final s sound, pronounced .

Stroke order

Other communicative representations

 Full Braille representation

 Computer encodings

References

Specific kana